The Old Redfield City Hall, at 517 N. Main St. in Redfield, South Dakota, was built in 1928.  It was listed on the National Register of Historic Places in 1997.

It is a two-story brown and red brick building,  in plan.  It served as city hall for Redfield from 1928 to 1979.

It was designed by Sioux Falls architects Perkins & McWayne, and was built by contractors Stolte & Dobratz.

References

		
National Register of Historic Places in Spink County, South Dakota
Early Commercial architecture in the United States
Buildings and structures completed in 1928